John Elliott Swana (born 1962) is an American jazz musician who played trumpet and flügelhorn until a benign tumor forced him to put down those instruments. He then picked up the valve trombone and electronic wind instrument to continue his music profession.

He began his career in clubs of his hometown of Philadelphia. He played in big bands, organ combos, and with musicians of the hard bop mainstream. Swana also worked with Ralph Bowen, Orrin Evans, Charles Fambrough,  Jimmy Greene, and J. D. Walter.

Discography 
 Introducing (Criss Cross Jazz, 1990)
 John Swana and Friends (Criss Cross, 1991)
 The Feeling's Mutual (Criss Cross, 1993)
 In the Moment (Criss Cross, 1995)
 Philly-New York Junction (Criss Cross, 1998)
 Tug of War (Criss Cross, 1997/98)
 Philly Gumbo (Criss Cross, 2001)
 On Target (Criss Cross, 2002)
 Philly Gumbo Vol.2 (Criss Cross, 2005)
 Bright Moments  (Criss Cross, 2008)
 Abohm (Gallta Media, 2012)
 Channels (1K, 2019)

As sideman
 Eric Alexander, Full Range (Criss Cross, 1995)
 Eric Alexander, New York Calling (Criss Cross, 1993)
 Chuck Anderson, Angel Blue Tour of Jazz (Anderson Music, 2002)
 Ralph Bowen, Soul Proprietor (Criss Cross, 2001)
 Orrin Evans, Justin Time (Criss Cross, 1997)
 Charles Fambrough, City Tribes (Evidence, 1996)
 Charles Fambrough, Keeper of the Spirit (AudioQuest, 1995)
 Jimmy Greene, Introducing Jimmy Greene (Criss Cross, 1997)
 Benny Golson, Remembering Clifford (Milestone, 1998)
 Peter Leitch, Trio/Quartet '91 (Concord Jazz, 1991)
 Donny McCaslin, Give and Go (Criss Cross, 2006)
 Clarence Penn, Play-Penn (Criss Cross, 2001)
 Chris Potter, Presenting Chris Potter (Criss Cross, 1993)
 J. D. Walter, Sirens in the C House (Dreambox 2000)

References

Sources
 Richard Cook, Brian Morton: The Penguin Guide to Jazz Recordings. 8. Auflage. Penguin, London 2006, .
 Lancaster Online
 Crisscross JAzz

External links
 
 Website of John Swana
 John Swana at phillyjazz.org

1962 births
Living people
American jazz trumpeters
American male trumpeters
American jazz flugelhornists
21st-century trumpeters
21st-century American male musicians
American male jazz musicians
Criss Cross Jazz artists